Ian Peter Cullimore (born 6 April 1962) is an English musician and journalist. He played guitar, between 1983 and 1988, for the Hull-based indie rock band The Housemartins.

Early life
He was born in Stapleford, Cambridgeshire. He moved to Birmingham, where he went to school at King Edward VI Camp Hill School for Boys, a state grammar school. His father was a university lecturer, and his mother was a piano teacher. He took a gap year.

He studied Maths at the University of Hull from 1980, graduating in 1984. He was a member of the University of Hull team that were runners up in the 2014 Christmas University Challenge.

Career

Music
He responded to a local newspaper advertisement by The Housemartins singer Paul Heaton seeking musicians in 1983. Most of the bands songs were written by Heaton and Cullimore. After leaving the band, he ran a whole food shop for about five years. He has performed on Songs from the Shed, which was published on its YouTube Channel.

Journalism and writing
Cullimore went on to become a journalist and author of over 120 children's books. He has written for publications such as the Daily Mail, the Hull Daily Mail and the Bristol Post. He also composes music and songs for children's television. In 2009, he co-wrote and appeared in a preschool music series called The Bopps for Nick Jr UK, which aired in April 2010.

He began working as a journalist in 2014, and wrote a column in a local Bristol paper. Alongside this he has been working with AuthorsAbroad, teaching young children, from all around the world, creative writing and music.

Personal life
He married his wife Amelia in May 1988 in Hull; they have two daughters and two sons together.

References

External links
 Cullimore's website
 
 Books for Keeps article

1962 births
Living people
Alumni of the University of Hull
English composers
English rock guitarists
English children's writers
People educated at King Edward VI Camp Hill School for Boys
People from Stapleford, Cambridgeshire
The Housemartins members